Commissioner v. Boylston Market Association, 131 F.2d 966 (1st Cir. 1942) was a taxation case decided by the United States Court of Appeals for the First Circuit.

Issues

Whether a cash method taxpayer is limited to the deduction of insurance premiums actually paid in any year or whether he should deduct each year the pro rata portion of the prepaid insurance attributable to that year?

Facts

The cash method taxpayer had a business in which he owned and managed real estate.  The taxpayer would purchase insurance policies covering periods of three or more years.  The taxpayer would then deduct each year an insurance expense in the amount of insurance premium applicable to carrying insurance for that year regardless of the year in which the premium was actually paid.

Analysis

In Welch v. De Blois, 94 F.2d 842 (1st Cir. 1938), the First Circuit allowed a cash method taxpayer to make a full deduction of insurance premiums in the year he paid them as an ordinary and necessary business expense, despite the fact that the insurance covered a three-year period.  However, this court is unable to find a basis for distinguishing the prepayment of rentals, bonuses for the acquisition of leases, bonuses for the cancellation of leases, commissions for negotiating leases – all of which need to be prorated over the time period - and prepaid insurance.  This court can cite no justification for treating prepaid insurance in a different manner than treating other prepayments.  To permit the taxpayer to take a full deduction in the year of payment would distort his income.  Moreover, prepaid insurance may be easily allocable.  The insurance premium represents the protection of the property for the entire period, and the taxpayer may surrender the insurance policy at any time.  Therefore, the insurance is clearly an asset having a longer life than a single taxable year.   Furthermore, by treating prepaid insurance as a capital expense, we are obtaining some degree of consistency.  We therefore overrule Welch v. De Blois and hold that prepaid insurance deductions must be allocable over the time period for which the policy covers.

References

1942 in United States case law
United States taxation and revenue case law
United States Court of Appeals for the First Circuit cases